The Sol Kangaroo is a Brazilian two-place paraglider that was designed and produced by Sol Paragliders of Jaraguá do Sul starting in the mid-2000s. It remained in production as the Kangaroo 4 in 2016.

Design and development
The Kangaroo was designed as a tandem glider for flight training and as such is referred to as the Kangaroo Bi, indicating "bi-place" or two seater.

The original Kangaroo was only available in one size, while the latest Kangaroo 4 is made in three sizes.

The design has progressed through four generations of models, the Kangaroo 1, 2, 3 and 4 each improving on the last. The models are each named for their relative size.

The Kangaroo 4 wing upper and lower surfaces are made from WTX 40 gr/m2 Nylon 6.6 HT PU+Silicone, the wing ribs and Pro-Nyl 42 gr/m2 Nylon 6.6 HT PU hard, with front profile nylon battens. The lines are Cousin Vectran ULTIMATE of 0.6 mm, 0.9 mm, 1.0 mm, 1.2 mm and 1.4 mm diameters as well as Cousin Technora Superaram lines of 1.5 mm, 2.1 mm and 2.5 mm diameters. The risers are fabricated from Premium 19 x 2,0 mm flat multi  Bl. 1.600 kg strapping. The carabiners are Ansung Precision 4mm 800 kg units while the pulleys are Nautos/SOL made.

The company says that the Kangaroo 4 should only be flown by experienced tandem pilots, as its handling and performance is similar to high performance paragliders.

Variants
Kangaroo 1 Bi
One size produced. The glider model is AFNOR Biplace  certified.
Kangaroo 4 S
Small-sized model for lighter crew. The glider model is LTF/EN C certified.
Kangaroo 4 M
Mid-sized model for medium-weight crew. The glider model is LTF/EN C certified.
Kangaroo 4 L
Large-sized model for heavier crew. The glider model is LTF/EN C certified.

Specifications (Kangaroo Bi)

References

Kangaroo
Paragliders